Kelsey Alexa Adrian (born October 5, 1989) is a Canadian female professional basketball player.

California and UC Santa Barbara statistics

Source

References

External links
Profile at usbasket.com

1989 births
Living people
People from Langley, British Columbia (city)
Canadian women's basketball players
Shooting guards
UC Santa Barbara Gauchos women's basketball players